= China Air =

China Air may refer to the following flag carrier airlines:

- Air China, the flag carrier and one of the major airlines of the People's Republic of China
- China Airlines, both the flag carrier and the largest airline of Republic of China (commonly known as Taiwan)
